Poplar Branch (formerly Currituck Narrows) is an unincorporated community in Currituck County, North Carolina, United States.

The Baum Site was listed on the National Register of Historic Places in 1980.

Poplar Branch has a post office with the ZIP code 27965.

References

Unincorporated communities in North Carolina
Unincorporated communities in Currituck County, North Carolina